A roadblock is a temporary installation set up to control or block traffic along a road.

Roadblock may also refer to:
 Traffic obstruction
Raasta roko ("obstruct the road" in Hindi), a commonly practiced form of protest in India

Media and entertainment
Roadblock (film), a 1951 crime thriller film
Roadblock (G.I. Joe), a fictional character in the G.I. Joe universe
Roadblock (Transformers), several characters in the Transformers toy line
Roadblock (robot), a contestant on the TV show Robot Wars, who won the first series
Roadblock (The Amazing Race), a task which has to be completed by only one person of a team on the CBS reality television series The Amazing Race
"Roadblock" (song), a single from 1987 by Stock Aitken Waterman that peaked at number 13 in the UK Charts
Roblox, online video game, often mispronounced or misheard by children or parents as "roadblocks" or "road blocks".

Sports
WWE Roadblock, a professional wrestling event
Roadblock (wrestler), American professional wrestler